The 2009–10 Lebanese Women's Football League was the 3rd edition of the Lebanese Women's Football League. Two-time defending champions Sadaka won their third title.

Partial league table

See also
2009–10 Lebanese Women's FA Cup

References

External links
RSSSF.com

Lebanese Women's Football League seasons
W1
2009–10 domestic women's association football leagues